The following is a list of the 87 municipalities (comuni) of the Province of Novara, Piedmont, Italy.

List

See also 
List of municipalities of Italy

References 

Novara